108 Squadron is a territorial reserve squadron of the South African Air Force.  The primary squadron operations include coastal reconnaissance flights, as well as command, control, and telstar communications in crime prevention operations alongside the South African Police and the South African Army.  The squadron is based in Port Elizabeth.

Main operations include coastal reconnaissance flights, command and control and telstar in crime prevention operations in co-operation with the police and Army.

References

Squadrons of the South African Air Force
Territorial Reserve Squadrons of the South African Air Force